James M. Ward (born May 23, 1951) is an American game designer and fantasy author who worked for TSR, Inc. for more than 20 years.

Career

Dungeons & Dragons and TSR 
Ward was one of the players in Gary Gygax's early Greyhawk games as Gygax developed the Dungeons & Dragons game. The Dungeons & Dragons character Drawmij was named after him; "Drawmij" is simply "Jim Ward" spelled backwards. Rob Kuntz and Ward's Gods, Demi-Gods & Heroes (1976) expanded the original D&D game by introducing gods. Ward designed Metamorphosis Alpha (1976), which was the first science-fantasy role-playing game, and published as TSR's fourth role-playing game. Ward co-authored Deities & Demigods (1980) . In the early 1980s, Ward and Rose Estes formed an education department at TSR, intended to sell classroom modules to teachers. Ward ran Kuntz's adventure "The Maze of Xaene" as the D&D tournament module at EastCon in 1983, although the module never saw print at TSR. Ward wrote Greyhawk Adventures (1988), a hardcover volume that presented new rules for the Greyhawk setting. Ward, with David Cook, Steve Winter, and Mike Breault, co-wrote the Ruins of Adventure adventure scenario that was adapted into the game Pool of Radiance.

In 1989 he was inducted into the Academy of Adventure Gaming Arts & Design Hall of Fame. When TSR produced a second edition of AD&D (1989), Ward instituted changes such as removing assassins and half-orcs from the game, explaining in Dragon #154 (February 1990) that "[a]voiding the Angry Mother Syndrome has become a good, basic guideline for all of the designers and editors at TSR, Inc"; Ward printed many upset readers' replies in Dragon #158. Ward can be glimpsed early in the Dragon Strike tutorial video playing the man who is slapped in the face at the king's party. Ward designed the Spellfire collectible card game. Ward was eventually made the VP for Creative Services, but left TSR over disagreements about how the company's crisis involving book sales in 1996 was handled.

After TSR 
Ward designed the Dragon Ball Z Collectible Card Game. Ward founded the d20 company Fast Forward Entertainment with Timothy Brown, Lester Smith, John Danovich, and Sean Everett. From 2000 - 2005, he was President of Fast Forward Entertainment, an independent game development company. Ward wrote Sete-Ka's Dream Quest (2006), an adventure gamebook published by Margaret Weis Productions. He wrote the Halcyon Blithe novel Dragonfrigate Wizard (Tor, 2006), which he considered one of his better and prouder creations. Ward joined Troll Lord Games, writing books such as the Towers of Adventures (2008) boxed set and the Of Gods & Monsters (2009) supplement for Castles & Crusades; Ward also became the editor for Troll Lord's C&C magazine, The Crusader Journal. Ward also wrote the horror fantasy game Tainted Lands (2009), based on C&Cs "SIEGE" system.

In June 2021, Ernie Gygax with Jeff R. Leason created a new, separate TSR company. The company is based out of Lake Geneva, Wisconsin; they plan to release table top games and operate the Dungeon Hobby Shop Museum, which is located in the first office building of the original TSR. Other original TSR employees contributing to the startup include Ward and Larry Elmore.

Personal life
James Ward married his wife Janean in the early 1970s, and they have three sons together, Breck, James, and Theon.

In 2010, Ward was diagnosed with a serious neurological disorder that required treatment at the Mayo Clinic. His friend Tim Kask has helped to establish a fund to help Ward offset some of the medical bills.

Selected works

Fiction
 Dragonsword of Lankhmar (TSR, 1986), a pair of gamebooks starring Fritz Leiber's Fafhrd and the Gray Mouser characters.
 Pool of Radiance, with Jane Cooper Hong, (TSR, 1989), a Forgotten Realms novel derived from the Pool of Radiance computer game.
 Pools of Darkness, with Anne K. Brown (TSR, 1992), the sequel to Pool of Radiance
 Pool of Twilight, with Anne K. Brown (TSR, 1993), the third book in the Pool series.
 Midshipwizard Halcyon Blithe (Tor Books, 2005).
 Sete-Ka's Dream Quest (Margaret Weis Productions, 2006).
 Dragonfrigate Wizard Halcyon Blithe (Tor Books, 2006).
 Time Twisters Anthology (Daw Books, 2006).
 The Curse of Time (Margaret Weis Productions, 2007).

Role-playing games
 Metamorphosis Alpha (TSR, 1976), the first science fiction role-playing game.
 Gods, Demi-Gods & Heroes, with Robert J. Kuntz (TSR, 1976), one of the four rules supplements to the original edition of Dungeons & Dragons.
 Gamma World, with Gary Jaquet (TSR, 1978), the first role-playing game in the post-apocalyptic subgenre.
 Deities & Demigods, with Robert J. Kuntz (TSR, 1980), a core rulebook for the 1st Edition of Advanced Dungeons & Dragons presenting similar material to that of Gods, Demi-Gods & Heroes.  This work introduced a number of now iconic Dungeons & Dragons deities, such as Corellon Larethian, Garl Glittergold, Gruumsh, Moradin, and Yondalla.
 The Mansion of Mad Professor Ludlow (TSR, 1980).
 Greyhawk Adventures (TSR, 1988), a hardcover sourcebook for the World of Greyhawk campaign setting.
 Metamorphosis Alpha 4th Edition (Mudpuppy Games, 2006).
 Towers of Adventure (Troll Lord Games, 2008), a digest box set for the Castles & Crusades game.
 Tainted Lands (Troll Lord Games, 2010), a dark horror themed box set expansion for the Castles & Crusades game.
 Beneath the Dome (Troll Lord Games, 2013), a serial adventure for the Castles & Crusades game.
 Gods and Monsters (Troll Lord Games, 2014), a book on gods and monsters from various mythologies for the Castles & Crusades game.
 77 Worlds RPG (http://Firesidecreations.com , 2014), a science fiction post apocalyptic role-playing game and campaign setting using the Ward Card System (WCS). The 77 Lost Worlds RPG is part of the Apocalyptic Space series of RPGs.

Television
 G.I. Joe: A Real American Hero (1985)

Other
Dragon Ball Z Collectible Card Game.
Westeros GAME OF THRONES Miniatures rules (2007).
Astrobirdz Concept card game, RPG, board game, coin game, YA novels.
 My Precious Presents card game
 Dragon Lairds board game, created by Ward and Tom Wham, was published in 2008 by Margaret Weis Productions, Ltd.
 In 2008, Ward became the Managing Editor of and a contributor to The Crusader magazine published by Troll Lord Games.

References

External links
 
 
 Games listing at Boardgamegeek.com

1951 births
20th-century American male writers
20th-century American novelists
21st-century American male writers
21st-century American novelists
American fantasy writers
American male novelists
Dungeons & Dragons game designers
Living people